Meiacanthus smithi, the disco blenny, is a species of combtooth blenny found in coral reefs in the eastern Indian ocean. This species grows to a length of  TL. It is also commonly known as Smith's fangblenny, Smith's sawtail blenny or Smith's harp-tail blenny. This species is also found in the aquarium trade.

Etymology
The specific name honours the South African chemist and ichthyologist James Leonard Brierley Smith (1897–1968) of Rhodes University in Grahamstown.

References

disco blenny
Fish of  the Indian Ocean
Fish of Sri Lanka
Fauna of Sumatra
Fauna of the Andaman and Nicobar Islands
disco blenny
Taxa named by Wolfgang Klausewitz